Baldo was the Judge of Gallura during the time of Comita I of Torres. He succeeded Manfred and both were probably Pisan clients. 

Comita made war on Baldo, defeated him, and captured him. His successor is not known with certainty. It was probably Constantine I, but was perhaps Saltaro.

Sources
Manno, Giuseppe (1835). Storia di Sardegna. P.M. Visaj.

Judges (judikes) of Gallura
11th-century rulers in Europe